Sorkh Valik (also Romanized as Sorkh Valīk; also known as Sorkh Valī and Sorkh Valtak) is a village in Garmab Rural District, Chahardangeh District, Sari County, Mazandaran Province, Iran. At the 2006 census, its population was 242, in 51 families.

References 

Populated places in Sari County